The men's team recurve competition at the 2006 Asian Games in Doha, Qatar was held from 9 to 13 December at the Lusail Archery Range.

Schedule
All times are Arabia Standard Time (UTC+03:00)

Results

Qualification

Knockout round

References 

Official Results

External links
Official website

Men